Takayasu is both a Japanese surname and a masculine Japanese given name.

Surname
, Japanese ophthalmologist
, Japanese sumo wrestler
, founder of the Okinawan Ijun religion
, Japanese footballer

Given name
, Japanese professional wrestler.
, Japanese footballer
, Japanese voice actor

See also
Takayasu's arteritis, a disorder of the aorta

Japanese-language surnames
Japanese masculine given names